The 2017 FINA World Water Polo Development Trophy was the 6th edition of the tournament organized by FINA and reserved for national teams from emerging countries in the world of water polo. It ran from 17 to 22 October 2017 at the Tal-Qroqq Sports Complex in Gżira, Malta; eight teams from four continental confederations participated at the competition.

Uruguay won the 3rd place match, but was later awarded the Trophy due to the disqualification of both Malta and Iran during the gold-medal  final.

Teams

Groups

Preliminary round

Group A

Group B

Knockout stage

Bracket

5th place bracket

Quarterfinals

Semifinals

5th to 8th place

Finals

7th place

5th place

3rd place

Gold-medal match
The final match of the competition between Malta and Iran was abandoned with 33 seconds in the match, with the host team leading 8–6.

The referees had excluded two Maltese and five Iranian players because of a series of altercations erupted after Malta scored the last goal, but the verbal fights increased between the players who were already outside the pool. Although there was no physical violence involved, all of the remaining players in the game rushed out of the water to support their teammates. 

The referees decided to cancel the game and refer the incidents to the FINA technical committee under the relevant disciplinary rules. Both finalists were disqualified, thus awarding the Trophy to Uruguay, winner of the 3rd place final.

Awards

 Top Scorer:  Diego Villar (19 goals)
 Most Valuable Player:  Santiago San Martín
 Best Goalkeeper:  Alfonso Rodríguez

Final standings

References

FINA World Water Polo Development Trophy
D
2017 in Maltese sport
International sports competitions hosted by Malta
FINA